Manza may refer to:

Manza language, a language of the Central African Republic
Mânza River, in Romania
Manza Bay, a bay of Tanzania
Tata Manza, an automobile by Tata Motors, India

People with the surname
Ferruccio Manza (born 1943), Italian cyclist
Nicholas Manza Kamakya (born 1985), Kenyan long-distance runner